Hilda Hilst (April 21, 1930 – February 4, 2004) was a Brazilian poet, novelist, and playwright. She is lauded as one of the most important Portuguese-language authors of the twentieth century. Her work touches on the themes of mysticism, insanity, the body, eroticism, and female sexual liberation. Hilst greatly revered the work of James Joyce and Samuel Beckett, and the influence of their styles—like stream of consciousness and fractured reality—is evident in her own work.

Personal life
Hilda de Almeida Prado Hilst was the only daughter of Apolônio de Almeida Prado Hilst and Bedecilda Vaz Cardoso. Her father owned a coffee plantation and also worked as a journalist, poet, and essayist. He struggled with Schizophrenia throughout his life. Her mother came from a conservative Portuguese immigrant family. Her parents conditions suffering from mental health and oppressive conservative social standards greatly influenced Hilst's writing. Her parents separated in 1932 while she was still an infant, and it was only three years later when her father received the diagnosis of Schizophrenia and thereafter spent much of his life in mental institutions. Her mother was also institutionalized at the end of her life for dementia.

Hilst grew up in Jaú, a town in the state of São Paulo, with her mother and half brother from her mother's previous marriage. Hilst attended elementary and high school at Collegia Santa Marcelina in São Paulo before enrolling in a bachelor's degree program at Mackenzie Presbyterian University. Before starting college, Hilst's mother told her of her father's condition, and Hilst went to visit him for the first time in a mental institution. Her visits with her father gave her unusual exposure to the severe cases of mental illness patients there suffered, which would come to impact Hilst's treatment of the mind and surrealism in her writing.

After graduating from Mackenzie Presbyterian, Hilst began studying for her second degree with the faculty of law at the University of São Paulo. While attending law school, Hilst met her lifelong friend Lygia Fagundes who would introduce her to contemporary Brazilian poetry.

Hilst published her first book of poetry in 1950, Presságio (Omen),  which received great acclaim from her contemporaries like Jorge de Lima and Cecília Meireles. It wasn't long before she published her second book, Balada de Alzira (Ballad of Alzira) in 1951. That same year Hilst took over guardianship of her ailing father. Later in 1957, Hilst began her seven-month tour of Europe, traveling through France, Italy and Greece.

Upon her return to São Paulo, Hilst remained a constant fixture on the city's nightlife scene for several years. However, after reading Report to Greco, an autobiography by Nikos Kazantzakis, Hilst decided to leave the bustling city life in 1964 and return to her childhood home in Campinas.

She ordered the construction of a new house on the same property, Casa do Sol (Sun House), which she personally designed in order to be an artistic space for inspiration and creativity. When it was completed in 1966, she moved into the house with sculptor Dante Casarini. In September of the same year, her father died.

Hilst married Casarini in 1968. Although the marriage only lasted twelve years, the two continued to live together in Casa do Sol. Hilst lived somewhat secluded in Campinas for the rest of her life, accompanied by her hundred dogs and other artists. She made Casa do Sol into a sort of artists’ hub, inviting writers to spend time there and enjoy the creative atmosphere. Two of the most important Brazilian authors to do so were Bruno Tolentino and Caio Fernando Abreu. During her time at Casa do Sol, Hilst also engaged in her own experiments with Electronic Voice Phenomena (EVP), an electronic recording method that supposedly interprets the voices of the dead.

Hilst wrote for fifty years with great success. The different periods of her life are reflected in the phases of her work. Beginning with her first book in 1950 through the time before she moved into Casa do Sol, Hilst primarily published poetry. Around the death of her father and her marriage in 1967, Hilst began writing and staging plays. After her divorce and through the rest of her life, Hilst's work was mostly fiction.

Author Hilda Hilst died on February 4, 2004, in Campinas at the age of 73. She spent her final days in the hospital following surgery for a fractured femur. Due to a chronic heart and pulmonary condition, Hilst was unable to recover.
 
Following her death, Hilst's friend Mora Fuentes created the Hilda Hilst Institute in her honor, an organization whose mission is to uphold Casa do Sol as a space for artistic creation and serves as a library and cultural center.
 
Hilst has recently garnered more fame among English language readership as several of her novels were translated and became available in English, such as With My Dog Eyes, The Obscene Madame D., and Letters from a Seducer.

Author Yuri Vieira, who lived in Casa do Sol for two years, wrote a book about the experience.

Career
Hilda Hilst wrote for almost 50 years, and collected the most important Brazilian literary prizes. Her work proceeded in several stages: she began as a poet, publishing Presságio in 1950; started publishing and staging plays in 1967; and shifted into prose in 1970, with her experimental text Fluxo-Floema. Throughout her career, beginning in 1958, with Adoniran Barbosa, musicians selected poems of hers to be set to music.

In 1962 she won the Prêmio PEN Clube of São Paulo, for Sete Cantos do Poeta para o Anjo (Massao Ohno Editor, 1962). In 1969, the play O Verdugo took the Prêmio Anchieta, one of the most important in the country at the time. The Associação Brasileira de Críticos de Arte (APCA Prize) deemed Ficções (Edições Quíron, 1977) the best book of the year. In 1981, Hilda Hilst won the Grande Prêmio da Crítica para o Conjunto da Obra, by the same Associação Brasileira de Críticos de Arte. In 1984, the Câmara Brasileira do Livro awarded her the Jabuti Prize for Cantares de Perda e Predileção, and the following year the same book claimed the Prêmio Cassiano Ricardo (Clube de Poesia de São Paulo). Rútilo Nada, published in 1993, took the Jabuti Prize for best short story, and finally, on August 9, 2002, she was awarded at the 47th edition of Prêmio Moinho Santista in the poetry category.

From 1982 to 1995 Hilst participated in the Programa do Artista Residente (Artist-in-Residence program), at the Universidade Estadual de Campinas - UNICAMP. Since 1995 her personal files have been in IEL-UNICAMP and are available to researchers worldwide.

In several of her writings Hilst tackled politically and socially controversial issues, such as obscenity, queer sexuality, and incest. The tetralogy that comprises O caderno rosa de Lori Lamby and Contos d'escárnio. Textos grotescos (1990); Cartas de um Sedutor (1991); and Bufólicas (1992), includes overtly pornographic material, if not "pornography" per se. She explored theological issues in her work as well.

Translation
A number of Hilst's books were originally published by smaller Brazilian publishers, but beginning in 2001, Editora Globo, the publishing branch of the Brazilian media organization Globo, began reissuing nearly all her works, as part of its Coleção Reunidas de Hilda Hilst., Some of her texts have been translated from Portuguese to French, English, Italian and German. In March 1997, her works Com meus olhos de cão and A obscena senhora D were published by Éditions Gallimard, translated by Maryvonne Lapouge. A obscena senhora D was translated into English  as The Obscene Madame D collaboratively by Nathanaël and Rachel Gontijo Araújo, and published jointly by Nightboat Books in New York and A Bolha Editora in Rio de Janeiro in 2012. In 2014, Letters from a Seducer, John Keene's translation of Brazilian Hilda Hilst's 1991 novel Cartas de um sedutor, was published by Nightboat Books and A Bolha Editora, and With My Dog Eyes, Adam Morris's translation of Hilst's 1986 novella Com os meus olhos de cão, was published by Melville House.

Further reading
 Bueno, M. A., & Hilst, Hilda (1996). Quatro mulheres e um destino: Hilda Hilst, Fernanda Torres, Fernanda Montenegro, Eliane Duarte. Rio de Janeiro, UAPE. 
 Pécora, Alcir (org.), Luisa Destri, Cristiano Diniz, and Sonia Purceno (2010). Por que ler Hilda Hilst.  São Paulo: Editora Globo. 
 Querioz, Vera. (2000). Hilda Hilst: três leituras. Editora Mulheres. 
 Siqueira de Azevedo Filho, Deneval (2007). A bela, a fera e a santa sem a saia: ensaios sobre Hilda Hilst.  Vitória: GM Gráfica e Editora.

References

External links
 Bio details, Releituras.com  - in Portuguese
 http://www.poetrytranslation.org/poets/hilda-hilst

1930 births
2004 deaths
Brazilian women poets
Brazilian people of German descent
University of São Paulo alumni
People from Campinas
20th-century Brazilian poets
20th-century Brazilian women writers
Brazilian women novelists
20th-century Brazilian novelists
Brazilian women dramatists and playwrights
20th-century Brazilian dramatists and playwrights